Hakimpur is an upazila of Dinajpur District in the Division of Rangpur, Bangladesh.

Geography
It has 13,769 households and total area 99.92 km2.

Hakimpur Upazila is bounded by Nawabganj and Birampur Upazilas on the north, Nawabganj and Ghoraghat Upazila on the east, Panchbibi Upazila in Joypurhat District on the south and Hili CD Block in Dakshin Dinajpur district, West Bengal, India, and Birampur Upazila on the west.

The 2nd largest land port of Bangladesh, Hili Land Port, is situated here.

Demographics
According to the 2011 Bangladesh census, Hakimpur Upazila had 22,895 households and a population of 92,599, 30.7% of whom lived in urban areas. 9.3% of the population was under the age of 5. The literacy rate (age 7 and over) was 54.7%, compared to the national average of 51.8%.

Administration
Hakimpur Thana was formed in 1950 and it was turned into an upazila in 1984.

Hakimpur Upazila is divided into Hakimpur Municipality and three union parishads: Alihat, Boalder, and Khattamadobpara. The union parishads are subdivided into 69 mauzas and 83 villages.

Hakimpur Municipality is subdivided into 9 wards and 17 mahallas.

Pouroshova 

 Hakimpur

Unions 

 Alihat
 khottamadabpara
 Boyaldar

See also
Upazilas of Bangladesh
Districts of Bangladesh
Divisions of Bangladesh
Hili Railway Station

References

Upazilas of Dinajpur District, Bangladesh